Laiatu Latu (born December 31, 2000) is an American football defensive end who currently plays for the UCLA Bruins. He previously played for the Washington Huskies.

Early life and high school
Latu grew up in Sacramento, California and attended Jesuit High School. He was named first team All-California after recording 94 total tackles, 29.5 tackles for loss, and six sacks as a senior. Latu was rated a four-star recruit and committed to play college football at Washington over offers from UCLA and USC.

College career
Latu began his college career playing for the Washington Huskies. He played in 12 games as a freshman and finished the season with 16 tackles and 1.5 tackles for loss. Latu suffered a neck injury during fall practices entering his sophomore year. Following the season, Washington's team doctors deemed that the injury had not recovered enough and that it would be too dangerous for Latu to continue playing football. Huskies' head coach Jimmy Lake announced that Latu had retired at the start of spring practices in 2021. He remained enrolled at Washington for the first semester of his junior year before entering the NCAA transfer portal to find a program where he could continue his college football career.

Latu ultimately transferred to UCLA. He was cleared to play by team physicians near the end on the Bruins' spring practices. Latu was named the Pac-12 Conference Defensive Player of the Week for Week 4 after recording three sacks and forcing a fumble against Colorado.

References

External links
 Washington Huskies bio
 UCLA Bruins bio

Living people
2000 births
American football defensive ends
Players of American football from Sacramento, California
UCLA Bruins football players
Washington Huskies football players